Asian Highway 12 (AH12) is a route of the Asian Highway Network, with a length of 1,195 km (747 miles) that runs from AH3 in Nateuy, Laos, through Muang Xay, Luang Prabang, Vang Vieng, Vientiane, Nong Khai, Udon Thani, Khon Kaen, Nakhon Ratchasima, and Saraburi until its terminus at AH1 in Nong Khae District, Saraburi Province, Thailand.

The highway has been in use since 8 April 1994. Its US$30 million cost was financed by Laos and Thailand, apart from the First Thai-Lao Friendship Bridge, funded by the Australian government as development aid for Laos.

Sections

Laos 
 : Nateuy–Vientiane
 Route 450: Vientiane–Thanaleng (Vientiane Prefecture), First Thai–Lao Friendship Bridge

Thailand 
  (Mittraphap Road): Nong Khai–Saraburi
  (Phahonyothin Road): Saraburi–Hin Kong, Nong Khae District

References 

Roads in Laos
Roads in Thailand
Asian Highway Network